The 2018 Belgian Cup Final, named Croky Cup after the sponsor, was the 63rd Belgian Cup final and took place on 17 March 2018. The match was played between Genk, who qualified on 6 February 2018, and Standard Liège who qualified two days later. In a dull match without many chances, Standard Liège won after extra time with the only goal coming from Renaud Emond at the beginning of extra time. As a result, Standard Liège qualified for the 2018–19 UEFA Europa League Group stage. 

Standard had already won the cup seven times (out of 16 finals), with their last win in 2016 against Club Brugge. Genk made its fifth appearance in the Belgian Cup Final and had won on all four previous occasions. The 2000 Belgian Cup Final also featured Genk and Standard, with Genk overcoming an early deficit to win by four goals to one.

Route to the final

Match

Summary
On an ice cold evening, both teams offered a very meagre display as the match started with many fouls and fierce duels, but without any chances. About 15 minutes into the match, a header from Renaud Emond that landed on top of the goal was the first meaningful event. As both teams did not succeed to set up successful combinations, they started trying long range shots, but neither Răzvan Marin nor Ibrahima Seck managed to keep their shots on target. Nikos Karelis did, but his shot was correctly disallowed for offside. Key players Alejandro Pozuelo and Mehdi Carcela were nowhere to be seen and only set pieces some small chances in the remainder of the first half, with both Christian Luyindama and Joseph Aidoo putting their headers off target.

The second half did not prove to be much better, Standard Liège started best with dangerous long distance kicks from Edmilson Junior and Collins Fai but still the match remained without a single effort on target. Alejandro Pozuelo was very much invisible, but almost benefited from a mistake from Luis Pedro Cavanda, before his assist was snatched away by Jean-François Gillet just before Nikos Karelis could get to it. A deflected shot from Răzvan Marin caused some minor excitement at the other end of the pitch. It took until the very end of the second half before a first attempt on target was made, Joseph Aidoo almost headed in the winner on a corner kick, but a stunning reflex from Jean-François Gillet denied his effort.

In the extra-time, Standard Liège started furiously, with a back-heel pass from Paul-José M'Poku setting up Mehdi Carcela to give a perfect assist for Renaud Emond who headed in the ball past Danny Vukovic. Genk now had to advance quickly and almost got lucky as a cross from Bojan Nastić nearly landed in goal. A free-kick from Ruslan Malinovskyi just missed the goal. In the second half of the extra-time, Genk was not able to get past Gillet, despite efforts from Leandro Trossard. The game had also become extra fierce, forcing referee Jonathan Lardot to give several yellow cards, eventually even sending off Bojan Nastić just minutes before time.

Details

Footnotes

External links
  

Belgian Cup finals
Cup Final
Belgian Cup Final
Sports competitions in Brussels
Belgian Cup Final
K.R.C. Genk matches
Standard Liège matches